Sultan Khalifa (born 1969) is an Emirati former cyclist. He competed in two events at the 1988 Summer Olympics.

References

External links
 

1969 births
Living people
Emirati male cyclists
Olympic cyclists of the United Arab Emirates
Cyclists at the 1988 Summer Olympics
Place of birth missing (living people)